The Schempp-Hirth Janus is a high performance two-seat glider that was built by Schempp-Hirth GmbH. It was the first high-performance two-seater.

Design and development
The design was by Dipl-Ing Klaus Holighaus and the prototype first flew in May 1974. The production examples incorporated several improvements in January 1975. The Janus has a glass-fibre monocoque fuselage similar to that of the Nimbus-2 but the cockpit section is lengthened to accommodate the two pilots in tandem with dual controls under a right-hand side-hinged one-piece canopy. Landing gear consists of either a non-retractable main wheel (Janus A, B & C) or a retractable main wheel (later models of Janus C and all Ce's) with a drum or disc brake, and a nose-wheel. The two-piece wings have 2° forward sweep on the leading edge, and have camber-changing flaps which are operated between +12° and -7°. The Janus has upper-surface airbrakes, and although uncommon the Janus C could also be fitted with a tail parachute.

The Janus was superseded by the unflapped Duo Discus which first flew in 1993; and the flapped Arcus which first flew in 2009.

Production
100 Januses were built by early 1980 plus three motorised Janus CMs. It is particularly suitable for instruction in cross-country flying in gliders with wing flaps.

Variants
Janus A
Janus BThe Janus B was produced from March 1978.  It has a fixed-incidence tailplane instead of the all-moving type previously fitted.
Janus CThe Janus C has carbon-fibre wings of 20 m span and a carbon-fibre tailplane.
Janus CeThe Janus Ce was certified in 1991 and incorporated modifications to the cockpit and fin.
Janus CMmotorised version with Rotax 535C engine
Janus CTmotorised version with Solo 2350 engine
Janus M a motorised version with a Rotax engine mounted on a pylon aft of the cockpit and retracting into the fuselage. The prototype first flew in 1978.
SCAP–Lanaverre SL-2The French developed the Janus as the SCAP–Lanaverre SL-2. (SCAP - Société de Commercialisation Aéronautique du Plessis SàRL) with Lanaverre Industries, It first flew in 1977.  The main differences from the Janus A are the provision for water ballast in the wings, a fixed tailplane with elevators, and a more comfortable cockpit.

Specifications (Janus C)

See also

References

1970s German sailplanes
Janus
Motor gliders
T-tail aircraft
Aircraft first flown in 1974